John Rubens Smith (January 23, 1775 – August 21, 1849) was a London-born painter, printmaker and art instructor who worked in the United States.

Biography
Smith was born in London, England where he first studied art with his father, John Raphael Smith, a mezzotint engraver. His mother was Ann Darlow, who married Smith's father until 1780 when they divorced. Smith later studied art at the Royal Academy.

Smith emigrated to New York City from London about 1807. He depicted the United States in the decades before photography, and influenced a generation of American artists through his drawing academies and drawing manuals. He died in New York City.

His son John Rowson Smith (1810–1864) was a moving panorama painter who worked with Richard Risley Carlisle.

Works

 The juvenile drawing-book (1844)

Gallery

References

 John Rubens Smith biography at the Library of Congress website (visited June 21, 2010)
 John Rubens Smith Created Pictorial Record of Early America  at the Library of Congress website (visited June 21, 2010)
 Vital data at printsandprintmaking.gov.au (visited June 21, 2010)

External links
John Rubens Smith, New York, N.Y. letter to Asher Brown Durand, 1826 May 25 (visited June 21, 2010)

1775 births
1849 deaths
American educators
English emigrants
18th-century American painters
18th-century American male artists
American male painters
19th-century American painters
19th-century male artists